Phyllonorycter ruizivorus is a moth   of the family Gracillariidae. It is found on La Réunion island in the Indian Ocean.

The length of the forewings is 2.8–2.91 mm. The forewings are golden ochreous with white markings consisting of a very short basal streak, two transverse fasciae, one costal and one dorsal strigulae and two terminal spots. The hindwings are light fuscous with a long greyish fringe.

The larvae feed as leaf miners on Ruizia cordata and Dombeya acutangula. The mine is tentiform. The underside is slightly elongate or oval and more or less opaque creamy. Mines have been found in mid-June, September and early October.

Etymology
The species is named after the genus of the host plant.

References

ruizivorus
Endemic fauna of Réunion
Moths of Réunion
Moths described in 2012

Taxa named by Jurate de Prins
Leaf miners